The 3rd constituency of Haute-Vienne (French: Troisième circonscription de la Haute-Vienne) is a French legislative constituency in the Haute-Vienne département. Like the other 576 French constituencies, it elects one MP using a two round electoral system.

Description

The 3rd Constituency of Haute-Vienne covers the northern part of the Department. In common with the other two constituencies of Haute-Vienne it includes some of the city of Limoges.

Similarly to Haute-Vienne's 2nd constituency this seat has traditionally supported candidates from the centre-left Socialist Party, the only exceptions in recent years being the 1993 and 2017 elections.

En Marche candidate Marie-Ange Magne was elected in 2017.

Assembly Members

Election results

2022

 
 
 
 
 
 
 
|-
| colspan="8" bgcolor="#E9E9E9"|
|-
 
 

 
 
 
 
 

* LREM dissident

2017

 
 
 
 
 
 
 
|-
| colspan="8" bgcolor="#E9E9E9"|
|-

2012

 
 
 
 
 
 
|-
| colspan="8" bgcolor="#E9E9E9"|
|-

2007

 
 
 
 
 
 
 
|-
| colspan="8" bgcolor="#E9E9E9"|
|-

2002

 
 
 
 
 
 
 
 
|-
| colspan="8" bgcolor="#E9E9E9"|
|-

1997

 
 
 
 
 
 
 
 
|-
| colspan="8" bgcolor="#E9E9E9"|
|-

References

3